Quviasukvik, is the first day of the year according to the Inuit. The festival of the New Year is celebrated by the Inuit, Yupik, Aleut, Chukchi and the Iñupiat. The feast originally derives from traditional Inuit religion but in modern times, it has Christian influences.

Timing 
The Quviasukvik festival starts on Christmas Eve and ends on January 7. This festival celebrates the coming of the new year and the sea goddess, Sedna and the transferring of spirits for good luck in the new year. During these days, many traditional customs are displayed. Due to Christian influences, Christmas was considered a new year to the Inuit.

See also
 Angakkuq
 Christmas
 First sunrise

References 

Festivals in Alaska
Festivals in Nunavut
Festivals in Greenland
Festivals in Russia
New Year in Canada
New Year in Russia
New Year in the United States
Shamanistic festivals
Cultural festivals in Canada
Cultural festivals in Greenland
Cultural festivals in Russia
Cultural festivals in the United States
Winter traditions
Inuit mythology
December observances
Observances on non-Gregorian calendars
Inuit culture
Winter events in Canada
Winter events in Greenland
Winter events in Russia
Winter events in the United States
Shamanistic holidays
Indigenous festivals in Canada
Christmas in Canada
Christmas in Denmark
Christmas in the United States
Indigenous peoples days